The Strathcona Ceremonial Mounted Troop is a ceremonial mounted cavalry unit of the Canadian Army, attached to Lord Strathcona's Horse (Royal Canadians), an armoured regiment based in Edmonton, Alberta. The is one of many Canadian ceremonial military units to have not received funding from the Government of Canada or the Canadian Forces. It is the last surviving military mounted troop in the country.

Overview

The troop is designed to be a link to the regiment's time as a cavalry unit in the early 20th century. The first members of the regiment were trained horsemen, who were recruited to serve as a match for the Boers in South Africa and to make up for the losses of the British Army's infantry. A similar purpose was given to the regiment when it joined the Royal Canadian Horse Artillery as part of the combined Canadian Cavalry Brigade during the First World War. The regiment established a ceremonial musical ride to perpetuate this history in 1923. It performed actively in Western Canada and the Northwestern United States until it was dissolved in 1939 following the start of the Second World War in Europe. The Strathcona Mounted Troop was re-formed in 1974 in time for the regiment's 75th anniversary and centennial of Calgary. It became a regular component of the regiment in 1977, and has since been designated the Strathcona Mounted Troop, to perpetuate the memory of the original mounted regiment. The troop was renamed the Strathcona Mounted Troop in 1991. The troop mounted the Queen's Life Guard at Buckingham Palace in September 2000, being the first time a unit other than the Household Cavalry or the Royal Horse Artillery provided a mounted guard in London.

It consists of 20 soldiers who perform in communities throughout Western Canada. In its shows, which are usually 35 minutes long, it combines traditional cavalry drill with the tent pegging that is often seen in equestrian sports. The soldiers in the troop volunteer for a minimum of one show season. Many of its members have come from uniformed organizations such as the Canadian Coast Guard, the Canadian Forces Regular Force and the Primary Reserve  and the Royal Canadian Mounted Police.

The organization consists of the following:

Leadership
Troop leader
Troop sergeant
Troop ride master
1st Section
8 mounted troopers
2nd Section
8 mounted troopers

Foundation
The Ceremonial Mounted Troop Foundation is a non-profit organization that provides financial support to the troop and is responsible for the maintenance of stock, uniforms and equipment of the unit. The foundation is a registered charity and relies on donations from show sponsors. Additional funding comes from honorariums provided by organizations and cities where the troop performs. The foundation in 1998 received a 20-horse trailer provided by one of its sponsors, Bison Transport in Winnipeg, to aid in transportation of the troop from venue to venue. The approximate cost to operate the unit is $150,000 annually.

Dress uniform
The current full dress uniform was adopted in the 1970s, patterned around the regimental uniforms of the 1920s. It is the No. 1 dress, and consists of a scarlet tunic with myrtle green facings; and a dragoon helmet with red and white plume. Its uniform is similar to those worn by the Household Cavalry in the United Kingdom, specifically the Life Guards.

See also
Musical Ride
The Governor General's Horse Guards

External links
LDSH(RC) - Lord Strathcona's Horse(RC) Ceremonial Mounted Troop Musical Ride
LDSH Museum and A Brief History of the Regiment
Strathcona Mounted Troops

References

Lord Strathcona's Horse (Royal Canadians)
Canadian ceremonial units
Equestrianism
1974 establishments in Canada